Ernst Zägel (5 March 1936 – 23 April 2020) was a German footballer who played for 1. FC Saarbrücken, VfR Kaiserslautern and the Saarland national team as a forward.

Zägel died on 23 April 2020, aged 84.

References

1936 births
2020 deaths
German footballers
Saar footballers
Saarland international footballers
Saarland B international footballers
1. FC Saarbrücken players
Association football forwards
Footballers from Saarland